Saadatabad (also Romanized as Sa‘ādatābād) is a village in Fasarud Rural District, in the Central District of Darab County, Fars Province, Iran. At the 2006 census, its population was 342, in 78 families.

References 

Populated places in Darab County